KRI I Gusti Ngurah Rai (332) is the second ship of the  of the Indonesian Navy.

Design and description  
The R.E. Martadinata class of guided-missile frigates of the Indonesian Navy are SIGMA 10514 types of the Netherlands-designed Sigma family of modular naval vessels, the frigates are each built from six modules or sections, for I Gusti Ngurah Rai, five were built at the PT PAL shipyard at Surabaya, and one of the module was built at Damen Schelde Naval Shipbuilding facility in Vlissingen, the Netherlands.

The ship is powered by combined diesel or electric (CODOE) propulsion, consisted of two  MCR diesel engines and two  MCR electric motors connected to two shafts with controllable-pitch propellers. The frigate has complement of 122 personnel.

She is armed with one OTO Melara 76 mm gun, one 35 mm Rheinmetall Oerlikon Millennium Gun close-in weapon system, and two 20 mm Denel GI-2 autocannons. For surface warfare, I Gusti Ngurah Rai are equipped with eight Exocet MM40 Block III anti-ship missiles, and twelve vertical launching system cell for MBDA MICA anti-aircraft missiles. For anti-submarine warfare, she is equipped with two triple 324 mm EuroTorp B515 torpedo tubes for A244/S Mod.3 Whitehead torpedoes.

Her electronic system and sensors consisted of Thales Group TACTICOS combat management system with ten Multifunction Operator Consoles (MOC) Mk.4, SMART-S Mk 2 3D multibeam surveillance radar integrated with Thales TSB 2520 IFF system, Sperry Marine BridgeMasterE ARPA navigation radar, STIR 1.2 MK.2 (STING) electro-optical fire control system, LINK Y Mk 2 datalink system, Thales UMS 4132 Kingklip medium frequency active/passive hull-mounted sonar, CAPTAS 2/UMS 4229 variable depth sonar, Thales VIGILE 100 ESM, Thales Scorpion ECM, and TERMA SKWS DLT-12T 130mm decoy launchers located in port and starboard.

I Gusti Ngurah Rai also has a hangar and flight deck at stern and could accommodate one <10 tons helicopter. The ship is usually assigned with an Eurocopter AS565 Panther helicopter. The frigate also carries two rigid-hull inflatable boats.

Construction and career 
The ship construction was started with the first steel cutting ceremony on 17 September 2014 at PAL Indonesia shipyard in Surabaya. Her keel was laid down on 18 January 2016. The Dutch-built module was transported to PAL Indonesia shipyard for final assembly. The frigate was launched on 29 September 2016. She underwent her first sea trial on 26 April 2017. The ship was handed over to the Indonesian Navy on 30 October 2017. I Gusti Ngurah Rai was officially commissioned on 10 January 2018 by Commander of the Indonesian National Armed Forces Air Chief Marshal Hadi Tjahjanto at Benoa Port, Bali.

The ship finished her FFBNW (Fit For But Not With) refit project, which consisted of four work stages, and was formally handed over to the Indonesian Navy on 3 November 2020. The refit project included the installation of the Rheinmetall Oerlikon Millennium Gun close-in weapon system and integration of the Sensor, Weapon and Command (SEWACO) system.

She participated in the 2022 RIMPAC in the Hawaiian Islands.

References

External links 

KRI I Gusti Ngurah Rai 332 Puputan Yudha Sagara (Garuda TV Show) by NET. TV on YouTube (in Indonesian)
Melaut Bareng Kapal Perang Canggih: KRI I Gusti Ngurah Rai-332 | Mata Najwa (in Indonesian)

2016 ships
Martadinata-class frigates
Ships built in Indonesia
Ships built in Vlissingen